Jonas Kjellgren (born 4 July 1977) is a Swedish musician and producer, now residing in Grangärde, Sweden. He has been lead vocalist for Carnal Forge and Dellamorte, played guitar for Centinex, and played bass for October Tide. He is most famous for being the former co-founder and guitarist of Scar Symmetry, founded in 2005. As a producer, he has worked with bands such as Sonic Syndicate, Zonaria, Steel Attack, 21Lucifers, Darzamat and The Absence. He owns and operates Black Lounge Studios, which many Swedish metal bands use to record, mix and master their albums, although most of his own production efforts are done at The Abyss, which is owned by Peter Tägtgren. Kjellgren is known for playing seven-string guitars.

Bands

Present
 Raubtier – bass
 Bourbon Boys – guitar, backing vocals
 Roadhouse Diet – vocals, guitar
 Ironmaster - guitar

Past
 Scar Symmetry – guitars, keyboards
 Carnal Forge – vocals
 Dellamorte – vocals, guitar, harmonica, percussion

Discography

References

External links
Black Lounge Studios
Official MySpace

1977 births
Living people
Seven-string guitarists
21st-century guitarists
Scar Symmetry members